Thailand is participating at the 2011 Southeast Asian Games which is being held in the cities of Palembang and Jakarta, Indonesia from 11 November 2011 to 22 November 2011.

Competitors

Medals

Medal table

Medals by date

2011
Nations at the 2011 Southeast Asian Games
2011 in Thai sport